Bath Bach Choir, formerly The City of Bath Bach Choir (CBBC), is based in Bath, Somerset, England, and is a registered charity. Founded in 1946 by Cuthbert Bates, who also became a founding father of the Bath Bach Festival in 1950, the choir's original aim was to promote the music of Johann Sebastian Bach via periodic music festivals. Bates – an amateur musician with a great love and understanding of this composer's works – was also the CBBC's principal conductor and continued in this role until his sudden death, in April 1980. This untimely exit pre-empted his planned retirement concert performance of J. S Bach's Mass in B minor, scheduled for July of the same year, and effectively ended the first period of the choir's history.

Distinguished Handelian scholar Denys Darlow succeeded Cuthbert Bates as musical director in 1980 and remained in the post until 1990. He was followed by Nigel Perrin until 1992. Perrin began his musical life as a chorister at Ely Cathedral, then won a choral scholarship to King's College, Cambridge, studying under Sir David Willcocks.  In 1970 he also joined the newly formed King's Singers, having sung with them on an occasional basis after graduation in the Summer of 1969, thereafter entertaining the world throughout the 1970s as the highest voice (counter-tenor) of the irrepressible and ground-breaking vocal group.

In 2023 Benedict Collins Rice was appointed music director, only the fourth in 75-years.  Originally from Oxfordshire, Collins Rice held two conducting scholarships at the University of Cambridge, before continuing his studies with the Heads of Conducting at the Royal College of Music, the Royal Northern College of Music, University of Music and Performing Arts Vienna and University of Birmingham where he studied under Simon Halsey CBE. Performing throughout Europe and the US, he has recorded for several labels, broadcast live on BBC Radio 3 and founded a chamber group, The Facade Ensemble.

The first president of the CBBC was Dr Ralph Vaughan Williams OM until 1958. Sir Arthur Bliss CH KCVO KT, then Master of the Queen's Music (Musik), took over as president in 1959, followed in 1975 by Sir David Willcocks CBE MC, until 2015. In 2016 David Hill (choral director) MBE, musical director of The Bach Choir was elected president of Bath Bach Choir, and Jonathan Willcocks a vice president.

Overview 
The Bath Bach Choir, a member of the Cultural Forum for the Bath area, has an illustrious history and continues to perform demanding and diverse choral works in the UK and overseas. Membership is governed by audition. The choir is widely regarded as one of the leading musical forces in the west of England and continues to perform two major orchestral concerts annually with a lighter concert in the summer. Most take place at Bath Abbey but other venues include Exeter Cathedral, The Forum, Bath the Michael Tippett Centre, the Wiltshire Music Centre in Bradford on Avon and the Roper Theatre, Hayesfield Girls' School, Bath.

Recent performances have included Sergei Rachmaninov, All-Night Vigil (Rachmaninoff), J.S Bach's St Matthew Passion and Mass in B minor, Mass in Blue by Will Todd, accompanied by the composer, Elis Pehkonen's Russian Requiem, also in the composer's presence, works by Sir Karl Jenkins and Sir James MacMillan's CBE St John Passion who attend the concert performed in Wells Cathedral. The choir's 60th Anniversary Concert, in the Wiltshire Music Centre in 2007, comprised a newly commissioned work by Ed Hughes, called Song for St Cecilia.

The choir regularly tours abroad: Karl Jenkins’ Requiem was performed at Carnegie Hall, New York, in 2008, and concerts have taken place at Cathédrale Notre-Dame de Chartres, Paris, and in Hungary, Belgium and Germany. In 2009 the choir was invited to perform in the famous Thomaskirche, where Johann Sebastian Bach was once choirmaster, Aix-en-Provence, in 2013, and the Bath Bach Choir's most recent tour to Barcelona: Barcelona Cathedral, Sagrada Família, Santa Maria del Mar, Barcelona in 2015.

Today, referred to as the Bath Bach Choir, the choir comprises about 100 committed singers from Bath and its environs, such as Frome, drawn from all walks of life, offering them the opportunity to sing challenging works at the very highest level with professional orchestras and soloists – the very proposition Cuthbert Bates made in 1946. The choir maintains an active list of patrons and friends who support its musical work in return for a range of related benefits.

The early years 1946–1980

The City of Bath Bach Choir gave its inaugural concert in June 1947 in Bath Abbey, performing J. S. Bach's Mass in B minor. Cuthert Bates chose Alan Bennett, then head of music at Bath Boys School (today Beechen Cliff School), to take on the roles of collaborator, assistant musical director and assistant director of the Bath Bach Festivals; the distinguished composer Dr. Ralph Vaughan Williams O.M. was appointed as president. In December 1947 the choir gave its first Carols by Candlelight concert in the historic Grand Pump Room, Bath, at which the choir displayed versatility and musicianship by introducing new carols and arrangements as well as old favourites for audience participation. These annual Christmas concerts continue to this day.

A year after his death, in August 1958, Vaughan Williams was succeeded as president by Sir Arthur Bliss, CH, KCVO, KT, Master of the Queen's Music. Sir Arthur died on 27 March 1975 and was replaced in July 1975 by distinguished choral musician and current president Sir David Willcocks CBE MC, then famous for his work as the director of music at King's College, Cambridge, who had recently been appointed director of the Royal College of Music.

The first Bath Bach Festival, in October 1950, commemorated the bicentenary of the eponymous composer's death and was a great success. A further seven festivals were held at approximately four-year intervals until 1982 but the eighth was a financial disaster and indicated the end of an era. However, in 1995 the Bath Bach Festival tradition was revived by Elizabeth Bates, Cuthbert Bates' daughter, and periodic Bach Festivals continued in Bath under her direction until October 2010. A new mini-Bath Bachfest was initiated in February 2012, sponsored by the Bath Mozartfest Charitable Trust.

In its first 35 years the City of Bath Bach Choir gave many performances of Bach's major choral works, including its signature work – the Mass in B minor – as well as the St Matthew Passion, St. John Passion, Christmas Oratorio and numerous cantatas and motets. Other European composers were also represented, since choir policy has always been to explore lesser-known masterpieces in addition to popular choral repertoire. The choir gave one of the first modern performances of the Claudio Monteverdi Vespers of 1610, and other concerts included works by Bononcini, Francesco Cavalli, Antonio Vivaldi, Heinrich Schütz, Marc-Antoine Charpentier, Camille Saint-Saëns, Gustav Holst, Anton Bruckner and William Walton. In October 1966, they gave one of the first UK performances of the Duruflé Requiem in Bath. Michael Tippett's oratorio A Child of our Time was sung under the composer's baton as a part of the Bath Festival in June 1968. During this period the works of Ralph Vaughan Williams, the choir's first president, also featured strongly.

From the beginning, the choir strove to obtain the highest quality professional support from professional orchestras such as the London Symphony Orchestra, Royal Philharmonic Orchestra and Boyd Neel Orchestra, though during the 1970s rising costs necessitated a modification of this practice. Similar attention was also given to the selection and engagement of solo singers such as Kathleen Ferrier, Dame Janet Baker, Margaret Cable, Wendy Eathorne, Eric Greene and John Shirley-Quick.
Meanwhile, notable conductors included Ralph Vaughan Williams, Josef Krips (who was so impressed by a performance of Haydn's The Creation with the London Symphony Orchestra that he repeated it at the Royal Festival Hall, London), Yehudi Menuhin, Basil Cameron, Reginald Jaques, Nadia Boulanger, Charles Groves, István Kertész and Sir David Willcocks.

Unaccompanied pieces were not neglected. There were frequent recitals and serenade concerts in which a wide field of music was explored from the sixteenth century school to the present day.

The next decade 1980–1990

The City of Bath Bach Choir had planned to appoint Denys Darlow to replace Cuthbert Bates on his retirement. He had played the harpsichord continuo at a number of Bath Bach Festivals in the preceding years, was well known to the choir and sympathised with its aims. However, after the latter's unexpected death and in recognition of Bates's long and distinguished service, Sir David Willcocks conducted the July 1980 performance of Bach's Mass in B minor as a tribute and memorial. Darlow took over thereafter and at the time of his appointment was a senior professor at the Royal College of Music, Director of Music at St George's Church, Hanover Square, London, and had for many years been director of the Tilford Bach Festival and London Handel Festival.

The choir spent the next ten years moving forward from the Bach Festival legacy and building on its reputation for exploring works in the choral canon. Stephen Dodgson's Te Deum was performed in October 1982 as a part of the last Bach Festival at which the choir sung. Beethoven's Missa Solemnis was performed in 1982, the last time this work was heard in Bath.  The choir continued to perform two major orchestral concerts each year as well as a 'lighter' summer concert and three seasonal performances of Carols by Candlelight. In April 1986 the choir gave the first performance of Denys Darlow's own Requiem, dedicated to the City of Bath Bach Choir itself.

From 1988 onwards, summer concerts were moved from Bath Abbey to the Michael Tippett Centre at Bath Spa University. In 1988 and 1989 these were conducted by Marcus Sealy, who joined the choir in January 1982 as Accompanist and Deputy Musical Director and remains in that post today. From 1987 to 1989 the carols concerts were conducted by Cuthbert's daughter, Elizabeth and attracted steadily increasing audiences. Denys Darlow died on 24 February 1915 aged 94.

Modern era: 1990–present

On 8 January 1990 Nigel Perrin took on the role of Director of Music for the City of Bath Bach Choir. As one of The King's Singers Perrin had sung all over the world with artists such as Kiri Te Kanawa and Sir Cliff Richard. Appointing a singer as musical director was a break from tradition but Perrin brought insight into the mechanics and techniques of choral singing and a determination to lead the choir to even higher professional standards. His first concert was the Monteverdi Vespers of 1610 in Bath Abbey in April 1990.

The choir continues to explore new and unusual works and notably gave a performance of David Fanshawe's African Sanctus and Diana Burrell's Benedicam Dominum, a work which enabled Marcus Sealy to demonstrate the magnificent new Klais organ in Bath Abbey. The choir performed Requiem Aeternam by Jonathan Lloyd in the presence of the composer, which necessitated synchronising with a pre-recorded backing track. More recently, performance of two 'cross-over' works by Karl Jenkins – The Armed Man and Requiem –  stretched the boundaries of CBBC singers' experience.

Modernism does not mean that the choir has neglected its roots and it often returns to the music of J. S. Bach. In April 1997 the choir gave a performance of the Mass in B minor in Bath Abbey under the baton of the president, Sir David Willcocks, to mark its 50th anniversary celebrations and, more controversially, gave a semi-staged and critically acclaimed performance of the St. John Passion in The Forum, Bath in April 2005, using lighting and moving images, and later as noted in the histogram of performances.

Over the years the choir has also travelled widely and developed relationships with singers in Bath's twin cities in: Hungary, the Béla Viká Choir; in Braunschweig (Brunswick), Germany with the Cathedral Dom Chor; and with Les Bengalis de Liège in Liège, Belgium. Braunschweig was heavily bombed by the allies on the nights of 14 and 15 October 1944, which inflicted substantial damage to the Dom (cathedral), and many people died. In October 2004 the CBBC was invited to join the Dom Chor in a performance of the Benjamin Britten War Requiem in the presence of HM Ambassador to Germany, HE Sir Peter Torry. This concert, at the Dom, was a centrepiece of the city's commemoration and an act of remembrance and reconciliation. In 2009 the choir travelled to perform in Bach's own Church, the Thomaskirche in Leipzig, and in October 2011 they toured to Rome, performing in both La Chiesa di Sant'Agnese in Agone, and The Venerable English College (colloquially referred to as English College, Rome), founded in 1579 by William Allen.

Carols by Candlelight concerts routinely occur in December each year, which from 2001 – 2012 included a performance by the choir's junior section, formed and led by Nigel Perrin and sponsored by the CBBC for more than a decade, 'to sow a seed for what may be to come in the future'. The City of Bath Bach Junior Choir enabled children from 8–15 years to sing together and learn basic musical techniques and at its height it had some 50 or more singers. In 2008 Simon Carr-Minns took the baton from Perrin, who handed it to Adrienne Hale in 2009, and two years later it passed Jamie Knights. The children, in distinctive purple T-shirts, gave regular charity performances. They helped to raise £4,200 for the Royal United Hospital in Bath and, in 2010, raised money for the 'Afghan Heroes Charity' through their vocals and accompanying video for 'Forever Young – a Song For Wootton Bassett', written by Alan Pettifer and commissioned as a tribute to the people of Royal Wootton Bassett for their support of UK Armed Forces repatriation. With numbers dwindling as more and more opportunities for choral work were being offered to local children, the decision was taken to wind up the program and they gave their final performance in 2012. However, an opportunity for talented young musicians is still provided as an interlude during the Carols concerts, principally performed by exceptional music students from Wells Cathedral School.

The Bath Bach Choir's biggest recent challenge – supported by the combined forces of Exeter Festival Chorus and The Wellensian Consort– was arguably staging two performances of The Saint John Passion, an exceptionally demanding contemporary piece composed by Sir James MacMillan CBE and sung in his presence. Performances took place at Wells Cathedral and then Exeter Cathedral in March 2013, with soloist Mark Stone as Christus, and Alexander Hohenthal leading Southern Sinfonia. The baroque performance of the Messiah (Handel), accompanied by Music for Awhile, with Leader Margaret Faultless, a musician within the Orchestra of the Age of Enlightenment went down especially well with the packed audience. Consequent upon Coronavirus (COVID-19) in 2020, and UK Government restrictions on live concerts, the choir produced three 'virtual performances' of singular works. The choir returned to Bath Abbey for a live concert, socially distanced, presented to a restricted but most appreciative audience of 150 people on 3 July 2021; judging by the request for an encore!

Performance chronology

References

External links
choir home page
bath camerata
cultural forum
Handel's Messiah produced by South West Film

Musical groups established in 1946
1946 establishments in England
Early music choirs
English choirs
Music in Bath, Somerset
Organisations based in Bath, Somerset
Ralph Vaughan Williams
Bach choirs
Musical groups from Somerset